W281BE, known as 104.1 the Bridge, is a Contemporary Christian radio station licensed to Fort Mill, South Carolina, which relays the HD2 channel of WRHM. W232AX, which broadcasts on 94.3 FM also airs the same programming (also relays WRHM-HD2). The station is owned by parent group, OTS Media, which also owns WRHI/1340 and Interstate 107.1/107.3 (WRHM/WVSZ)

The station airs Winthrop University basketball, as well as a coaches' show featuring Pat Kelsey.

A ribbon cutting took place September 30, 2014.

References

External links

Christian radio stations in South Carolina
Radio stations in the Charlotte metropolitan area
York County, South Carolina
Rock Hill, South Carolina